Arthur E. Morgan may refer to:
 Arthur Ernest Morgan (1878–1975), American administrator, educator and engineer
 Arthur Eustace Morgan (1886–1972) British professor of English and principal of University College Hull and McGill University